Pak Kret is one of the twelve subdistricts (tambon) of Pak Kret district, in Nonthaburi province, Thailand. Neighbouring subdistricts are (from north clockwise) Bang Phut, Khlong Kluea, Bang Talat, Ko Kret and Bang Tanai. In 2020 it had a total population of 35,942 people.

Administration

Central administration
The subdistrict is subdivided into 5 villages (muban).

Local administration
The whole area of the subdistrict is covered by Pak Kret City Municipality.

References

External links
Website of Pak Kret City Municipality

Tambon of Nonthaburi province
Populated places in Nonthaburi province